The Muretto Pass (2,562 m) is a high mountain pass in the Alps on the border between Switzerland and Italy. It connects Maloja in the Swiss canton of Graubünden with Chiesa in Valmalenco in the Italian region of Lombardy. The pass lies between Monte del Forno (Bregaglia Range) and Piz Fedoz (Bernina Range).

The pass is traversed by a trail.

See also
 Muretto Pass on Hikr

References

Mountain passes of Italy
Mountain passes of the Alps
Italy–Switzerland border crossings
Mountain passes of Graubünden
Bernina Range